Saint-Lambert-sur-Dive (literally Saint-Lambert on Dive) is a commune in the Orne department in north-western France.

Significance

Saint-Lambert-sur-Dive is recognised as the place where the 4th Canadian Armoured Division (specifically the South Alberta Regiment and Argyll & Sutherland Highlanders of Canada) fought tenaciously in the closing stages of the Battle of Normandy. It is the place where Major David Vivian Currie won his Victoria Cross. The action centred on the stone bridge across the Dives and later, down to the ford at Moissy, both of which provided the Germans with escape routes across the river.

See also
Communes of the Orne department

References

Saintlambertsurdive